Upton is a Wirral Metropolitan Borough Council ward in the Wirral West Parliamentary constituency.

Councillors

References

Wards of Merseyside
Politics of the Metropolitan Borough of Wirral
Wards of the Metropolitan Borough of Wirral